Ann Devries (born 27 February 1970) is a former professional tennis player from Belgium.

Biography
Devries, a right-handed player, was born in the Flemish city of Bree. She trained in Antwerp from the age of 12, and by 15 was making her debut for the Belgium Fed Cup team. Her match against Steffi Graf in the first round of the 1986 Fed Cup was the first appearance of the then West German in the competition. Devries was a member of Belgium's World Youth Cup winning side in 1986 and won the girls' doubles title at the 1987 Australian Open with Nicole Provis.

Early in her career, she was in a relationship with top Swedish player Magnus Gustafsson.

She broke through on the WTA Tour in 1987 with singles quarterfinal appearances in four tournaments, at Auckland, Taipei, Singapore and Knokke. These efforts made her the first Belgian woman to reach the world's top 100 in singles. Her best performance came at the Sofia Open in 1988 where she made the semi-finals and three months later reached her career best ranking of 77 in the world. She made the third round of the 1990 Wimbledon Championships as a qualifier. Her run was ended by seventh seed Katerina Maleeva.

As a doubles player, she peaked at 93 in 1991, and later reached her only WTA Tour final in the doubles at the 1993 edition of the Belgian Open.

A hernia injury caused her retirement from professional tennis in 1994.

After finishing her Fed Cup playing career with a 12/13 overall record from 15 ties, she returned to captain the team from 2012 to 2016. She has also been the personal coach of several Belgian players, including  Yanina Wickmayer.

WTA career finals

Doubles: 1 (1 runner-up)

ITF Circuit finals

Singles: 4 (1–3)

Doubles: 3 (3–0)

References

External links
 
 
 

1970 births
Living people
Belgian female tennis players
Belgian tennis coaches
People from Bree, Belgium
Sportspeople from Limburg (Belgium)
Australian Open (tennis) junior champions
Grand Slam (tennis) champions in girls' doubles